Austin Taylor O'Brien (born May 11, 1981) is an American actor and photographer. He is known for playing the co-lead Danny Madigan in the Arnold Schwarzenegger film Last Action Hero, followed by his turn into romance as Nick Zsigmond in My Girl 2, a part in both The Lawnmower Man and its sequel, and as Josh Greene in the CBS drama Promised Land. He originally gained fame from a Circuit City commercial as a kid who, after finding out he had saved money, says, "Cool" to the store's employee.

O'Brien was born in Eugene, Oregon, to Valerie and Dan O'Brien. His elder sister is actress Amanda O'Brien and his younger brother is actor Trever O'Brien.

Filmography

References

External links

A. O'Brien Photography

1981 births
American male child actors
American male film actors
American male television actors
Living people
Photographers from Oregon